Kosmos 695 ( meaning Cosmos 695), also known as DS-P1-Yu No.73, was a Soviet satellite which was launched in 1974 as part of the Dnepropetrovsk Sputnik programme. It was a  spacecraft, which was built by the Yuzhnoye Design Bureau, and was used as a radar calibration target for anti-ballistic missile tests.

A Kosmos-2I 63SM carrier rocket was used to launch Kosmos 695 from Site 133/1 of the Plesetsk Cosmodrome. The launch occurred at 11:59:58 UTC on 20 November 1974, and resulted in the satellite successfully reaching low Earth orbit. Upon reaching orbit, the satellite was assigned its Kosmos designation, and received the International Designator 1974-091A. The North American Aerospace Defense Command assigned it the catalogue number 07538.

Kosmos 695 was the seventy-third of seventy nine DS-P1-Yu satellites to be launched, and the sixty-sixth of seventy two to successfully reach orbit. It remained in orbit until it decayed and reentered the atmosphere on 15 July 1975.

See also

1974 in spaceflight

References

1974 in spaceflight
Kosmos satellites
Spacecraft launched in 1974
Dnepropetrovsk Sputnik program